The Federal Coal Mine Health and Safety Act of 1969, U.S. Public Law 91-173, generally referred to as the Coal Act, was passed by the 91st United States Congressional session and enacted into law by the 37th President of the United States Richard Nixon on December 30, 1969.

The S. 2917 legislation created the Mining Enforcement and Safety Administration (MESA), later renamed the Mine Safety and Health Administration (MSHA), as well as a National Mine Map Repository, within the Department of the Interior.

MSHAs responsibilities paralleled those of Occupational Safety and Health Administration (OSHA) but addressed underground and surface mining of coal. The legislation was more comprehensive and stringent than previous federal laws governing the mining industry.

The Coal Act required two annual inspections of every surface coal mine and four at every underground coal mine, and dramatically increased federal enforcement powers in coal mines. The Coal Act also required monetary penalties for all violations, and established criminal penalties for knowing and willful violations. The safety standards for all coal mines were strengthened, and health standards were adopted.

The Coal Act also included specific procedures for the development of improved mandatory health and safety standards, and provided compensation for miners who were totally and permanently disabled by the progressive respiratory disease caused by the inhalation of fine coal dust pneumoconiosis or "black lung".

In regard to the mine map repository, the Coal Act required that:

"Whenever an operator permanently closes or abandons a coal mine, or temporarily closes a coal mine for a period of more than ninety days, he shall promptly notify the Secretary of such closure. Within sixty days of the permanent closure or abandonment of the mine, or, when the mine is temporarily closed, upon the expiration of a period of ninety days from the date of closure, the operator shall file with the Secretary a copy of the mine map revised and supplemented to the date of the closure."

Initial enforcement of the law was slow due to understaffed enforcement agencies, a situation which was criticized when the Hurricane Creek mine disaster occurred a year to the day after passage of the act, killing 38 men in a mine with a long history of violations.

It was updated by the Federal Mine Safety and Health Act of 1977, Public Law 95-164.

See also

 National Mine Map Repository
 Coal mining in the United States
 List of coal mines in the United States
 Mining accident
 Occupational Safety and Health Act

References

External links 
MSHA website: History of federal mine safety legislation accessed March 8, 2006
US Code
Legislative history 

1969 in American law
91st United States Congress
United States federal health legislation
United States federal public land legislation
Mine safety
Coal mining law